Lahore Race Club, in Lahore, Punjab, Pakistan, is a club concerned with the sport of horse racing, established in 1924 when Lahore was part of the Punjab Province of British India.

History
The club is registered as a company. Some veterans claim that it dates from 1874, but although there were horse races at Lahore during that period the formal record of the present club does not go back so far. It was incorporated on 18 January 1924.

The club's racecourse was initially at Jail Road, Lahore, the current site of Jilani Park. In 1976, Zulfikar Ali Bhutto's government asked the club to move its races away from the Jail Road course, but it remained there until 1980, when it was compelled to leave.

Races were not held for about fifteen months, but in September 1981 the club reinstated its racing programme on a new course at Kot Lakhpat which has a length of 2,254 metres. Since then, it has gained in strength and now organizes, among other races, the Pakistan Derby.

In June 2005, the club hosted Pakistan's first evening horse race under floodlights. The opening ceremony was attended by Pervez Musharraf, President of Pakistan, and Mohammed bin Rashid Al Maktoum, crown prince of Dubai, who had financed the night-racing project, the cost of which was some Rs 30 million.

See also
 Karachi Race Club

References

External links
 Lahore Race Club Video

1924 establishments in British India
Horse racing organizations
Sports venues in Pakistan
Horse racing venues in Pakistan
Horse racing organisations in Pakistan
Sports clubs in Pakistan
Lahore